Fran Lynch (December 13, 1945 – October 1, 2014) was an American collegiate and professional football running back. He played for the Denver Broncos for his entire career, in the American Football League (AFL) from 1967–1969 and in the National Football League (NFL) from 1970–1976.  He missed his final season of 1976 with a knee injury.  Before his Pro Football career, he played for Hofstra University.

See also
Other American Football league players

References

1945 births
Sportspeople from Bridgeport, Connecticut
2014 deaths
American football running backs
Hofstra Pride football players
Denver Broncos (AFL) players
Denver Broncos players
Players of American football from Connecticut